Kakavadzor (also Romanized as Kak’avadzor and Kaqavadzor; also known locally as, Farukh) is a village in the Kotayk Province of Armenia. There are the ruins of S. Astvatsatsin, the chapel of Verin Vank (Upper Monastery) located north of the village, and a chapel in the cemetery (northwest) upon the hill. According to locals, there are supposedly other churches nearby, and possibly a monastery in the gorge northwest of the village.

Kakavadzor is served by local public transportation that brings residents to nearby Hrazdan only four times a day since roads are in poor condition. Air pollution from the MIKA Cement factory in Hrazdan has been a continuing problem for residents.

Education and culture 
A single school serves Kakavadzor. Teachers are brought in from neighboring villages and Hrazdan since there are not enough qualified teachers found locally to fill the positions.

Gallery

See also 
Kotayk Province

References 

 

Populated places in Kotayk Province